The Constant Nymph is a 1943 romantic drama film starring Charles Boyer, Joan Fontaine, Alexis Smith, Brenda Marshall, Charles Coburn, May Whitty, and Peter Lorre with a famous score by Erich Wolfgang Korngold.   It was adapted by Kathryn Scola from the 1924 novel of the same name by Margaret Kennedy and the 1926 play by Kennedy and Basil Dean and directed by Edmund Goulding.

Plot
Belgian composer Lewis Dodd's latest symphony has flopped. Seeking new inspiration, he travels to a Swiss chalet to visit his mentor, Albert Sanger, and his family. Sanger's four young daughtersKate, Toni, Tessa and Paulahave a crush on Dodd. Tessa, particularly, believes that someday, when she is old enough, he will recognize the depth of her affection for him. Lewis brings out his newest work, a symphonic poem called “Tomorrow,” which he has composed for the Sanger girls to play. Albert himself is far more pleased with this “trifle” than with Lewis’s noisy modernist symphony. However, shortly afterwards, the elderly, hard-drinking Sanger dies while orchestrating Lewis’s “little tune", a task which Dodd now vows to complete himself.

While remaining with the Sangers to help the family cope with their loss, Lewis renews an acquaintance with the beautiful, sophisticated Florence Creighton. Later, Lewis asks her to marry him. Tessa collapses at the news. Only her closest sister, Paula, understands why. Six months later, Florence and Lewis are in London, living in her father‘s large townhouse. They are taking care of Tessa and Paula, who now attend a boarding school. Both girls find the experience unbearable. After they run away, a worried Lewis notifies Scotland Yard. But the elusive Tessa and Paula arrive at the townhouse, just in time to witness Lewis's private performance of "Tomorrow."  Much to everyone's disappointment, Lewis has taken the beautiful melody and buried it under a modernist “bangety bang” racket. As a result, even Lewis himself is convinced that more changes are needed before the scheduled concert of the piece is to take place. He thus asks Tessa to stay and help him remember the more Romanticist conception of "Tomorrow" as originally envisioned by Sanger.

A few weeks later, it is the day of the concert. While dressing for the occasion, Tessa, who has a history of cardiac problems, suffers a fainting spell. Florence, who has become jealous of Tessa's close collaborative relationship with Lewis, convinces her she cannot attend. She might have palpitations and cause a scene. So Tessa remains in the townhouse's study, where she listens to a radio broadcast of the new version of "Tomorrow" as it is performed before an audience. Before the composition's end, however, she collapses to the floor and dies. At the concert hall, the presentation is met with a long ovation. Lewis rushes home to tell Tessa of their success but instead witnesses the sight of Tessa's body lying on the study floor. Lewis calls her name and embraces her, his face wet with tears. The film's score climaxes as the log in the fireplace seems to spark, then flame, and then dissolve into a brilliant sky.

Cast

Music
Erich Wolfgang Korngold composed the music for The Constant Nymph. The symphonic poem Tomorrow, which was given a complete performance in the film, became Opus 33 in the roster of his works. It first was performed in concert in 1944.

Reception
Fontaine was nominated for the Academy Award for Best Actress.

Box-office
According to Warner Bros. records, the film earned $1,833,000 in the U.S. and $1,619,000 in other markets.

Availability
The will of Margaret Kennedy stated that the film could be shown only at universities and museums after its original theatrical run ended.  As a result, the film was unavailable for exhibition for nearly 70 years. The film received its first authorized public screening in decades as part of the 2011 Turner Classic Movies Classic Film Festival.

Edmund Goulding's biographer Matthew Kennedy wrote that Joan Fontaine spoke "rapturously" of The Constant Nymph: "She was nominated for a best actress Oscar for it, and it remains a personal favorite of hers."

The film was released on DVD under the Warner Archive Collection label on 22 November 2011.

Radio adaptation
The Constant Nymph was presented on Hollywood Players December 17, 1946. Fontaine reprised her role from the film.

See also
 The Constant Nymph (novel)

References

External links
 
 
 
 
 
 
 THE SCREEN: 'The Constant Nymph,' With Joan Fontaine, Alexis Smith, Brenda Marshall and Charles Boyer, Arrives at the Strand (New York Times movie review)

1943 films
1943 romantic drama films
American romantic drama films
American black-and-white films
1940s English-language films
Films based on British novels
Films based on adaptations
American films based on plays
Films directed by Edmund Goulding
Films produced by Hal B. Wallis
Films scored by Erich Wolfgang Korngold
Films set in Switzerland
Warner Bros. films
Films about composers
Films with screenplays by Kathryn Scola
1940s American films